The Eurovision Song Contest 2021 was the 65th edition of the Eurovision Song Contest. Organised by the European Broadcasting Union (EBU) and host broadcasters  (NPO),  (NOS) and AVROTROS, the contest was held at Rotterdam Ahoy, and consisted of two semi-finals on 18 and 20 May, and a final on 22 May 2021. The three live shows were presented by Dutch television presenters and singers Chantal Janzen, Edsilia Rombley and Jan Smit, and Dutch YouTube personality and makeup-artist Nikkie de Jager.

Thirty-nine countries participated in the contest, of which twenty-six re-entered the artists chosen for 2020 (albeit with different songs, as per the contest's rules).  and  returned after their absence from the 2019 contest, while  and  did not return after their participation in the 2019 edition.  and  had originally planned to participate, but Armenia withdrew due to its social and political crises following the Second Nagorno-Karabakh War, and Belarus was disqualified after submitting entries in violation of the rules twice, and not providing an eligible entry before the deadline.

For the first time since , none of the top three entries were performed in English, with France and Switzerland performing in French, whilst the winner, Italy, performed in Italian.

The EBU reported that the contest had an audience of 183 million viewers in 36 European markets, an increase of a million viewers from the previous edition, with an increase of seven percent in the 15–24 year old age range.

Location 

The 2021 contest was held in Rotterdam, the Netherlands, following the country's victory at the 2019 edition with the song "Arcade", performed by Duncan Laurence. The selected venue was the 16,400-seat Ahoy Arena in Rotterdam Ahoy, a convention centre and multi-purpose indoor arena located on Ahoyweg, which serves as a venue for many events, including concerts, exhibitions, trade fairs, and conferences. Rotterdam Ahoy had previously hosted the Junior Eurovision Song Contest 2007, and was set to host the 2020 contest before its cancellation. The "Turquoise Carpet" event, where the contestants and their delegations are presented before the accredited press and fans, took place at the Rotterdam Cruise Terminal on 16 May 2021.

Host city selection 

By Eurovision tradition, the Netherlands received the right to host the Eurovision Song Contest after the country won the competition in 2019. The Dutch host broadcasters NPO, NOS and AVROTROS launched the bidding process in the same month, on 29 May, in which five citiesArnhem, 's-Hertogenbosch, Maastricht, Rotterdam, and Utrechtsubmitted their bid books during a ceremonial event held in Hilversum on 10 July 2019. On 16 July, Maastricht and Rotterdam were shortlisted, and after the NPO visited both cities, on 30 August 2019, Rotterdam was announced as the host city of the Eurovision Song Contest 2020. 

Following the cancellation of the 2020 contest, the EBU began talks with broadcasters NPO, NOS and AVROTROS, as well as the city of Rotterdam, on the possibility of staging the 2021 contest in the city. On 23 April 2020, the municipal council of Rotterdam approved an increased budget after Dutch media reported that the city would require an additional €6.7 million to host the contest. The decision was imminent as it was required that the EBU be informed by late April if Rotterdam was willing to host the contest. If Rotterdam declined to host the event, NPO, NOS and AVROTROS had until mid-May 2020 to find an alternative. During the broadcast of Eurovision: Europe Shine a Light, which aired on 16 May 2020, Rotterdam was confirmed as the host city of the 2021 contest.

Production 
The Eurovision Song Contest 2021 was a co-production between three related Dutch television organisations —  (NPO),  (NOS) and AVROTROS — of which each assumed a different role. Sietse Bakker and Astrid Dutrénit served as executive producers, while Emilie Sickinghe and Jessica Stam served as deputy executive producers. Marnix Kaart, Marc Pos and Daniel Jelinek served as directors of the three live shows, and Gerben Bakker served as head of show. Background music for the shows was composed by Eric van Tijn.

In January 2020, the EBU announced that Martin Österdahl would become the executive supervisor for the Eurovision Song Contest after the 2020 edition, succeeding Jon Ola Sand.

The additional money was allocated to contingency scenarios that were eventually discarded.

Impact of the COVID-19 pandemic 

On 7 May 2020, the Dutch authorities prohibited all mass gatherings in the country until a COVID-19 vaccine became available. The host broadcasters stated that they were assessing the decision and how it would impact the event.

On 18 September 2020, the EBU released a summary of contingency scenarios for the contest in order for it to take place regardless of the circumstances, including:
 The event being held as in previous years (Scenario A);
 The event being held with social distancing measures in place (Scenario B);
 Providing the option for acts to perform from their home country if they are unable to travel to Rotterdam (Scenario C);
 A fully-remote contest hosted from Rotterdam (Scenario D), with all acts performing from their home country, and no in-person festivities or audience in Rotterdam. This scenario was trialled during the Junior Eurovision Song Contest 2020.

In February 2021, the EBU and the host broadcasters stated that it had ruled out hosting the contest as normal (Scenario A). Scenario C was also modified – all acts would perform remotely like in scenario D. A health and safety protocol for the contest was published on 2 March 2021, with the EBU affirming that the contest would be held under scenario B, while reiterating that downscaling options remained on the table should circumstances change. On 30 April 2021, the EBU confirmed scenario B for the contest.

On 1 April 2021, it was announced that an audience of 3,500 people would be allowed at each of the nine shows, including the three live shows and six rehearsals; the Dutch cabinet later gave its approval on 29 April. All audience members must have had tested negative for COVID-19.

Due to pandemic precautions, the "Turquoise Carpet" event was the only in-person side event to take place in 2021. Impacted side events included: the Opening Ceremony event, which was not held; the Eurovision Village, which took place from 15 to 23 May in an online-only form; and the EuroClub, which was cancelled for this year.

Visual design 
On 18 September 2020, along with possible scenarios, the EBU confirmed that the planned visual design and slogan for 2020, "Open Up", would be used for the 2021 contest as well. The revamped official logo and branding was unveiled on 4 December 2020. Designed by Clever°Franke, it is "an abstract presentation inspired by the map of the world and visually connects the location of the capitals of the [then] 41 participating countries with Rotterdam as Europe's beating heart". The revamped visual identity, designed by MediaMonks and NEP, was built around patterns and 'tracks' that symbolises the Netherlands and "opening up".

Presenters 

In addition, De Jager and Krista Siegfrids ('s representative in the  contest) were the presenters of the contest's online content. Siegfrids hosted Krista Calling, a weekly YouTube series with behind-the-scenes coverage from Rotterdam, and De Jager hosted LookLab with NikkieTutorials, an online talk show series featuring 38 participants with Queen Máxima as a special guest. ,  and  moderated the contest's press conferences, while Van Plateringen and  hosted the "Turquoise Carpet" event.

Stage design 

During the announcement of the dates of the 2021 contest, Sietse Bakker, executive producer of the 2021 contest, stated that the planned 2020 stage design would also be used in the 2021 contest. The design was inspired by the slogan "Open Up" and the typical Dutch flat landscape. The Eurovision stage was designed by German stage designer , who also designed the stages for the contests in 2011–12, 2015, and 2017–19. The stage design was complemented by augmented reality effects. Unlike the 2019 contest, the green room was placed in the main performance venue, and encompassed the entire floor space previously reserved for the standing audience, so as to facilitate social distancing.

Opening and interval acts 
On 4 May 2021, the EBU released information about the opening and interval acts.

The first semi-final was opened by Duncan Laurence, performing "Feel Something", and featured singer and YouTuber Davina Michelle and actress Thekla Reuten in an interval act titled "The Power of Water", centering on the Netherlands' history of water management. Michelle performed her new single "Sweet Water" in the performance. In both acts, augmented reality was used.

The second semi-final was opened by breakdancer Redouan "Redo" Ait Chitt and singer-songwriter Eefje de Visser, with ballet dancer Ahmad Joudeh and BMX-er Dez Maarsen performing during the interval; the acts are titled "Forward Unlimited" and "Close Encounter of a Special Kind", respectively.

The final was opened by the traditional flag parade, introducing all twenty-six finalists, accompanied by a remix of "Venus" produced and performed by 16-year-old DJ Pieter Gabriel, with co-presenters Chantal Janzen, Jan Smit and Edsilia Rombley singing parts of the song. A dance sketch titled "The Human Countdown" was then performed, which signified the closure of the voting window.

Format

Entries 

For this year, delegations were given the option to use pre-recorded backing vocals. Each delegation could still choose to use backing singers, whether on or off stage, or a combination of live and recorded backing vocals. All lead vocals performing the melody of the song must still be live, according to the rules. As a measure to guarantee that all participants could take part in the contest, every national broadcaster were required to create a 'live-on-tape' backup recording prior to the contest, which could be used if a participant was unable to travel to Rotterdam, or subjected to quarantine on arrival. The recordings took place in a studio setting, in real-time (as it would be at the contest) without any edits to the vocals or any part of the performance itself after the recording. A set of production guidelines was also revealed to ensure fairness and the integrity of the recordings.

Other rules for the entries stayed the same in the 2021 contest. This includes that the maximum length for a song is three minutes, that there can be at most six performers on stage, and that the compositions (lyrics and music) must not have been commercially released before 1 September of the year before. Following the cancellation of the 2020 contest, the EBU explored the option of allowing the songs selected for the 2020 contest to compete in the 2021 contest, which needed to be discussed with the Eurovision Song Contest reference group and the national broadcasters. Victoria, Bulgaria's representative for 2020 and 2021, publicly expressed her support for such a move. However, on 20 March 2020, the reference group decided that, in accordance with the rules of the Eurovision Song Contest, the 2020 songs would not be eligible to compete in the 2021 contest.

Semi-final allocation draw

On 17 November 2020, the EBU confirmed that the semi-final allocation draw for the 2021 contest would not be held. Instead, the semi-finals would feature the same line-up of countries as determined by the draw for the 2020 contest's semi-finals, which was held on 28 January 2020 at the Rotterdam City Hall and hosted by contest presenters Chantal Janzen, Jan Smit and Edsilia Rombley. The draw also determined which semi-final each of the six automatic qualifiers – host country the Netherlands and "Big Five" countries France, Germany, Italy, Spain and the United Kingdom – would broadcast and vote in. The EBU also decided to maintain the Netherlands' grand final running order position – 23.

The pots used initially for the 2020 contest featured as follows:

Postcards 
The "postcards" were 40-second video introductions shown on television whilst the stage was being prepared for the next contestant to perform their entry. Filmed between January and April, and directed by Martijn Nieman and Laurence Drenthe, with Kevin Soares serving as executive producer, the 2021 postcards were based on the "Open Up" theme of the contest. In a departure from the initial concept created for the 2020 contest owing to travel restriction concerns, the postcards involved the acts being presented through footage shot in their country of origin. These were inserted via chroma keying onto the framework of a 'tiny house' set-up in various locations around the Netherlands, and decorated with items personal to the artist(s). At the end of each postcard, a light streak hit the house and was refracted into a country-specific coloured streak, mimicking the prism and transitions to the stage, where the ceiling was lit up with that country's flag colours using augmented reality. The postcards were produced by Amsterdam-based agency IDTV, with additional post-production and VFX work by Antwerp-based agency STORM. The following locations were used for each participating country:

 Hoge Brug, Maastricht
 Sparta Stadion Het Kasteel, Rotterdam
 , Frisian Lakes
 Giethoorn
 Bourtange
 Agelo
 Broek op Langedijk
 's-Hertogenbosch
 Almere
 Nijmegen
 Circuit Zandvoort
 Sibelco silver sand quarry, Heerlen
 Houtribdijk
 Port of Rotterdam
 Scheveningen
 , 
 Zeeburgereiland, Amsterdam
 Hermitage Amsterdam
 Utrecht Centraal railway station
 Arnhem
 Middelburg
 Rotterdam Centraal railway station
 Vlissingen
 Schiermonnikoog
 Ouddorp
 , Eext
 Koppelpoort, Amersfoort
 Amsterdam Airport Schiphol
 , Delft
 Leeuwarden
 Bolwoningen, 's-Hertogenbosch
 Evoluon, Eindhoven
 Keukenhof, Lisse
 Marker Wadden
 Doornspijk
 Museumplein, Amsterdam
 Noordereiland, Rotterdam
 Veluwezoom National Park
 Gasselte

Participating countries 

The EBU initially announced on 26 October 2020 that 41 countries would participate in the contest, featuring the same line-up of countries that were set to participate in the cancelled 2020 edition. Bulgaria and Ukraine marked their return to the contest after their absences from the 2019 contest, while Hungary and Montenegro were confirmed as non-returning following their latest appearances in 2019.

In March 2021, Armenia and Belarus confirmed their non-participation in the contest; Armenia withdrew due to social and political crises in the aftermath of the Second Nagorno-Karabakh War, Belarus was disqualified from the contest after submitting entries in violation of the rules twice, and not providing an eligible entry before the deadline, thereby reducing the number of participating countries to 39.

Returning artists 
After the cancellation of the 2020 contest, the participating broadcasters of 24 countries announced that, for the 2021 contest, they would internally select the same artists initially selected for 2020. In addition, the artists initially selected for Estonia and Lithuania in 2020 won their national finals to represent their countries in 2021.

Discounting 2020, the contest featured three representatives who also previously performed as lead vocalists for the same country, and five artists who participated in other Eurovision events or as backing vocalists for the same or for another country.

Semi-final 1
The first semi-final took place on 18 May 2021 at 21:00 (CEST). Sixteen countries participated in the first semi-final. Those countries plus ,  and the  voted in this semi-final.  was originally allocated to participate in the first half of the semi-final, but was disqualified from the contest after submitting entries in violation of the rules twice, and not providing an eligible entry before the deadline. The highlighted countries qualified for the final.

Semi-final 2
The second semi-final took place on 20 May 2021 at 21:00 (CEST). Seventeen countries participated in the second semi-final. Those countries plus ,  and the  voted in this semi-final.  was originally allocated to participate in the second half of the semi-final, but withdrew from the contest due to social and political crises in the aftermath of the Second Nagorno-Karabakh War. The highlighted countries qualified for the final.

Final 
The final took place on 22 May 2021 at 21:00 (CEST). Twenty-six countries participated in the final, with all thirty-nine participating countries eligible to vote.

Detailed voting results

Semi-final 1

12 points

Below is a summary of the maximum 12 points awarded by each country's professional jury and televote in the first semi-final. Countries in bold gave the maximum 24 points (12 points apiece from professional jury and televoting) to the specified entrant.

Semi-final 2

12 points
Below is a summary of the maximum 12 points awarded by each country's professional jury and televote in the second semi-final. Countries in bold gave the maximum 24 points (12 points apiece from professional jury and televoting) to the specified entrant.

Final

12 points 
Below is a summary of the maximum 12 points awarded by each country's professional jury and televote in the final. Countries in bold gave the maximum 24 points (12 points apiece from professional jury and televoting) to the specified entrant.

Spokespersons 
The spokespersons announced the 12-point score from their respective country's national jury in the following order:

 Lucy Ayoub
 Ida Nowakowska
 Monica Fabbri
 Andri Xhahu
 Stephanie Spiteri
 
 Vane Markoski
 Ell and Nikki
 Silje Skjemstad Cruz
 Nieves Álvarez
 Philipp Hansa
 Amanda Holden
 Carolina Di Domenico
 Lorella Flego
 Manolis Gkinis
 Aminata Savadogo
 Ryan O'Shaughnessy
 Sergey Stepanov 
 
 
 Loukas Hamatsos
  Danira Boukhriss
 Barbara Schöneberger
 Joel Creasey
 
 Elisa
 Tayanna
 Hannes Óli Ágústsson 
 Cătălina Ponor
 Ivan Dorian Molnar
 Taťána Kuchařová
 Oto Nemsadze
 Andrius Mamontovas
 Tina Müller
 Polina Gagarina
 Carla
 Carola
 Angélique Beldner
 Romy Monteiro

Other countries 

Eligibility for potential participation in the Eurovision Song Contest requires a national broadcaster with active EBU membership that would be able to broadcast the contest via the Eurovision network. The EBU issued an invitation to participate in the contest to all active members. Associate member  did not need an invitation for the 2021 contest, as it had previously been granted permission to participate at least until 2023.

Active EBU members 
 In November 2019, Democrats for Andorra, the ruling party of Andorra, stated that the country would eventually return to the contest, with a cost assessment as a prerequisite. Susanne Georgi, the  Andorran representative, stated in May 2020 that she had secured the funding required for the country to return.
 Having intended to compete in 2020, Armenia were initially confirmed for the 2021 contest when the list of participants was announced by the EBU in October 2020, and were set to perform in the second half of the second semi-final. However, on 5 March 2021, the Public Television Company of Armenia (AMPTV) confirmed that they were subsequently unable to participate due to social and political crises in the country in the aftermath of the Second Nagorno-Karabakh War.
 Having intended to compete in 2020, Belarus were initially confirmed for the 2021 contest when the list of participants was announced by the EBU in October 2020, and were set to perform in the first half of the first semi-final. However, on 26 March 2021, Belarus was disqualified by the EBU after their intended entry "Ya nauchu tebya (I'll Teach You)" by Galasy ZMesta was rejected due to violating the rules, and not being able to submit an eligible replacement entry. Six days after the Eurovision final, the EBU voted to suspend Belarusian broadcaster BTRC's membership due to concerns about the content that it was broadcasting. BTRC was given two weeks to respond before the suspension comes into effect on 11 June, but there was no public response. The broadcaster was expelled from the EBU on 1 July, rendering future participations impossible until at least 2025.
 In response to rumours that the EBU had been in discussions with Morocco regarding participation, Karim Sbai, the Director of Communications of Morocco's Société Nationale de Radiodiffusion et de Télévision, stated in February 2020 that Morocco's possible return had not yet been discussed. Ultimately, Morocco was not included on the final list of participants for 2021.
 In May 2020, Faruk Kaymakcı, Turkish Deputy Minister of Foreign Affairs & Director for EU Affairs, stated that he hoped to see Turkey returning. However, Turkey was not included on the final list of participants for 2021.

Associate EBU members 
 In August 2020, the EBU stated that they had no intention to invite Kazakhstan for this year.

Non-EBU members 
 In August 2020, the EBU stated that they had no intention to invite Kosovo for this year.
 In July 2020, Liechtensteiner broadcaster 1 FL TV announced that they had ruled out debuting in 2021. The broadcaster had attempted to become an EBU member in the past but halted its plans when its director, Peter Kölbel, unexpectedly died. It would also need the backing of the Liechtenstein government to be able to carry the cost of becoming an EBU member and paying the participation fee for the contest.

Broadcasts 

All participating broadcasters may choose to have on-site or remote commentators providing an insight about the show and voting information to their local audience. While they must broadcast at least the semi-final they are voting in and the final, most broadcasters air all three shows with different programming plans. Similarly, some non-participating broadcasters may still want to air the contest.

The European Broadcasting Union provided international live streams of both semi-finals and the final through their official YouTube channel with no commentary. The live streams were geo-blocked to viewers in Australia, Greece, Latvia, Lithuania, Ukraine, United States and the United Kingdom. After the live broadcasts, all three shows were made available for every country listed above except the United States.

Viewing figures

Incidents

Disqualification of Belarus 

Two days after "Ya nauchu tebya (I'll Teach You)" was announced as the Belarusian entry for the contest, the EBU ruled that the song did not comply with the contest's rules against political entries, and that the song was not eligible to compete in the contest unless it was modified or replaced. After failing to meet an extended deadline for submitting an eligible entry, with their second submission "Pesnya pro zaytsa (Song About Hares)" also being found to not comply with the rules, it was announced on 26 March 2021 that Belarus was disqualified from the contest.

Ukrainian rehearsal stand-in
Before 's second rehearsal on 12 May, lead singer of the band Go_A, Kateryna Pavlenko, reported feeling unwell. In accordance with the contest's health and safety protocols, Pavlenko was required to quarantine in her hotel room. The other band members tested negative and were able to rehearse, with Dutch stand-in singer Emmie van Stijn providing vocals instead of Pavlenko. Pavlenko took a COVID-19 PCR test, which came back negative the following day, allowing her to perform again.

Van Stijn received positive reactions for her performance, in particular for her pronunciation of the Ukrainian lyrics, and was invited to sit with the Ukrainian delegation in the green room during the first semi-final.

COVID-19 infections

Ahead of the "Turquoise Carpet" event, one member of each of the Polish and Icelandic delegations tested positive for COVID-19. As a result, those delegations were absent from the event, having gone into self-isolation in accordance with the contest's health and safety protocols. The Romanian and Maltese delegations were also absent from the event on a precautionary measure, as they were based in the same hotel as the Polish and Icelandic delegations.

All other members of the Polish and Icelandic delegations tested negative, and remained in quarantine until the jury show of the second semi-final. However, it was later confirmed that a member of the Icelandic group Daði og Gagnamagnið had tested positive, and as a result, the group withdrew from performing in the live shows. Footage from their rehearsal at Rotterdam Ahoy was broadcast instead during both the jury show and the live show of the second semi-final; this footage was also shown in the final. The remaining members of the Polish delegation were subsequently released from isolation.

On 20 May, the EBU confirmed that Duncan Laurence had tested positive and would not perform live in the final. He was due to perform his winning song "Arcade" and his new single "Stars" during the interval, and present the points on behalf of the Dutch jury; the latter role was filled by Romy Monteiro. Pre-recorded rehearsal footage of Laurence's interval performance was broadcast instead during the final. Due to the positive test result, Laurence was also not present to hand over the trophy to the winner; the presenters handed over the trophy instead.

The day after the final, a member of the Norwegian delegation tested positive and was forced to remain in Rotterdam for isolation. It was later confirmed that six additional members of the delegation had tested positive after returning to Norway.

Technical issues

Jury show issues 
During the jury show of the first semi-final, the Romanian, Ukrainian and Maltese delegations reported problems with their performances; most notably, Roxen was heard to be offbeat with the chorus of their song "Amnesia". The EBU later confirmed that in-ear monitoring issues had occurred and that all artists involved would be given a second chance to perform. No issues occurred during the second performances.

During 's jury final performance, the rotating platform did not stop when it was supposed to, leading Senhit to have to jump from it while in motion. The Sammarinese delegation later filed a complaint, also claiming that all the camera shots were distorted due to these timing issues. The delegation offered to allow Senhit and Flo Rida to withdraw from the event, though they ultimately decided to stay. The contest's executive supervisor, Martin Österdahl, apologised to the delegation and reaffirmed that the issue would be addressed moving forward and that they would be protected to the highest degree.

Camera breaking prior to Ireland's performance
During the setup for 's performance in the first semi-final, a camera broke, which caused an extended delay after the postcard was shown. Co-presenter Chantal Janzen improvised in the green room during the live broadcast to fill in the time.

False allegation of drug use 
During a green room segment in the final, Damiano David, lead singer of the Italian band Måneskin, was claimed by some online viewers on social media to be seen snorting a line of cocaine when leaned over a table, although there were no drugs in the footage and the singer was sitting away from the table, close to the Italian delegation members. In the band's press conference following their victory, Torbjörn Ek, a journalist working at the Swedish newspaper Aftonbladet, asked about the allegations, which David denied by suggesting that fellow member Thomas Raggi had broken a glass which David was picking up off the floor, going on to say "I don't use drugs, please guys, do not say that." The band later released a statement on their official Instagram account, stating: "We are really shocked about what some people are saying about Damiano doing drugs. We really are AGAINST drugs and we never used cocaine. We are ready to get tested, cause we got nothing to hide." The EBU released a statement the following day, stating that the band, their management and the Italian head of delegation had denied any allegation, and the singer in question, Damiano, requested to be tested the same night, but as testing could not be immediately organized, he would "take a voluntary drug test after arriving home." It was also confirmed that "broken glass was found after an on site check". The allegation case was mostly forced in the French press and got even commented by the French foreign minister Jean-Yves Le Drian, but France Télévisions announced that they won't file any official charges, while in the Italian press, it was described as a social media joke that had gone too far and become fake news.

On 24 May, the EBU released a statement confirming that no drug use took place in the green room during the final, following a negative drug test and inspection of all available footage. The EBU also expressed concern over "inaccurate speculation leading to fake news [that] has overshadowed the spirit and the outcome of the event and unfairly affected the band."

Dutch televoting issues 
The EBU confirmed on 24 May that they had issues handling the Dutch televote in the final. Many people on social media complained about their votes not being counted and had only received their confirmation texts hours after the show. The EBU later confirmed to NOS that those votes were not counted due to a problem with the Dutch branch of the telecom provider T-Mobile, while clarifying that they had no authority over the issue. The Dutch televote, however, remains valid.

Other awards 
In addition to the main winner's trophy, the Marcel Bezençon Awards and the Barbara Dex Award were contested during the Eurovision Song Contest 2021. The OGAE, "General Organisation of Eurovision Fans" voting poll also took place before the contest.

Marcel Bezençon Awards 
The Marcel Bezençon Awards, organised since 2002 by Sweden's then-Head of Delegation and 1992 representative Christer Björkman, and winner of the 1984 contest Richard Herrey, honours songs in the contest's final. The awards are divided into three categories: the Artistic Award, the Composers Award, and the Press Award. The winners were revealed shortly before the Eurovision final on 22 May.

OGAE 
OGAE, an organisation of over forty Eurovision Song Contest fan clubs across Europe and beyond, conducts an annual voting poll first held in 2002 as the Marcel Bezençon Fan Award. After all votes were cast, the top-ranked entry in the 2021 poll was Malta's "" performed by Destiny; the top five results are shown below.

Barbara Dex Award
The Barbara Dex Award, created in 1997 by fansite House of Eurovision and organised by fansite Songfestival.be since 2017, was awarded to the performer voted to have worn the most notable outfit. The top-ranked entry this year was Norway's representative Tix, who was the last person to ever receive the award, due to its cancellation the following year.

Eurovision Awards
The Eurovision Awards, first held in 2021, saw competing acts celebrated across ten categories. Shortlists were determined by major Eurovision fansites and podcasts, with editors and presenters nominating their favourites in each category; the final result was determined by followers of the official Eurovision Instagram channel who cast votes for their favourite act.

Winners are listed first, highlighted in boldface, and indicated with a double dagger (‡). Runners-up are indicated with a single dagger (†).

Eurovision Song Celebration: Live-On-Tape 
The EBU announced on 29 March 2021 that the Eurovision Song Celebration would return for a second edition, premiering on the contest's official YouTube channel. Krista Siegfrids presented the show, which was aired in two parts on 28 and 29 May, and provided a showcase for the 'live-on-tape' back-up performances along with additional bonus material.

The first part of the show featured the back-up performances of the semi-finalists that failed to qualify for the final (excluding ), while the second part featured the back-up performances of the finalists (excluding the ).

As with the previous year's Song Celebration, fans were asked to contribute to the show by sending video clips of their favourite entries.

Official album 

Eurovision Song Contest: Rotterdam 2021 is the official compilation album of the contest, put together by the European Broadcasting Union and was released by Universal Music Group digitally on 16 April 2021 and physically on 23 April 2021. The album features all 39 entries including the semi-finalists that failed to qualify for the final.

Charts

See also 
 Junior Eurovision Song Contest 2021

Notes

References

External links 

 
 

 
2021
Music festivals in the Netherlands
2021 in the Netherlands
2021 in Dutch television
2021 song contests
May 2021 events in Europe
Events in Rotterdam
Music in Rotterdam
Impact of the COVID-19 pandemic on the music industry
Impact of the COVID-19 pandemic on television